Aleksandr Nikolaevich Nikolaenko (born 6 June 1980) is an internationally elite badminton player. Nikolaenko was part of the Favorit Ramenskoe badminton club, and in 2000, he was selected to join the national team. He was the bronze medallists at the European Mixed Team Badminton Championships in 2009 and 2011. Nikolaenko also the champion at the National Championships in the men's and mixed doubles event. In 2012, he competed at the Summer Olympics in London.

Achievements

BWF Grand Prix 
The BWF Grand Prix has two level such as Grand Prix and Grand Prix Gold. It is a series of badminton tournaments, sanctioned by Badminton World Federation (BWF) since 2007. The World Badminton Grand Prix sanctioned by International Badminton Federation since 1983.

Men's doubles

Mixed doubles

 BWF Grand Prix Gold tournament
 BWF Grand Prix tournament

BWF International Challenge/Series
Men's doubles

Mixed doubles

 BWF International Challenge tournament
 BWF International Series tournament
 BWF Future Series tournament

Record Against Selected Opponents
Mixed Doubles results with Valeria Sorokina against Super Series finalists, Worlds Semi-finalists, and Olympic quarterfinalists.

  Tao Jiaming & Tian Qing 0–1
  Zhang Nan & Zhao Yunlei 0–3
  Xu Chen & Ma Jin 0–3
  Lee Sheng-mu & Chien Yu-chin 0–1
  Joachim Fischer Nielsen & Christinna Pedersen 0–1
  Thomas Laybourn & Kamilla Rytter Juhl 2–2
  Michael Fuchs & Birgit Michels 2–1
  Chris Adcock & Imogen Bankier 1–0
  Fran Kurniawan & Pia Zebadiah Bernadet 0–1
  Lee Yong-dae & Ha Jung-eun 0–1
  Yoo Yeon-seong & Jang Ye-na 0–1
  Chan Peng Soon & Goh Liu Ying 1–0
  Robert Mateusiak & Nadieżda Zięba 1–2
  Vitalij Durkin & Nina Vislova 5–2
 / Robert Blair & Gabrielle White 0–1
  Songphon Anugritayawon & Kunchala Voravichitchaikul 1–0
  Sudket Prapakamol & Saralee Thungthongkam 2–1

References

External links
 

Russian male badminton players
1980 births
Living people
Sportspeople from Novosibirsk
Badminton players at the 2012 Summer Olympics
Olympic badminton players of Russia